Lods is a commune in the Doubs département in the Bourgogne-Franche-Comté region in eastern France.

Geography 

History 
It is first documented in 1189, and there are archaeological remains from the fifth and the seventh centuries.

Population

Economy 
Viticulture was the primary activity until the phylloxera infestation. The arrival of the railroad caused both the vineyards and the forges to decline due to outside competition.

Tourism 
Lods is a village with two hotels and a campground. Outdoor activities include tennis, fishing, and canoeing. Also worth seeing are the Musée de la Vigne et du Vin viticulture museum and art gallery.

See also
 Communes of the Doubs department

References

External links

 Lods on the intercommunal Web site of the department 

Communes of Doubs
Plus Beaux Villages de France